Chinatown After Dark is a 1931 American pre-Code drama film directed by Stuart Paton and starring Carmel Myers, Rex Lease and Barbara Kent.

Cast
Carmel Myers as Madame Ying Su
Rex Lease as James 'Jim' Bonner
Barbara Kent as Lotus
Edmund Breese as Le Fong
Frank Mayo as Ralph Bonner
Billy Gilbert as Horatio Dooley
Michael Visaroff as Mr. Varonoff
 Laska Winter as Ming Fu
 Willie Fung as 	Ling Chi 
 George Chesebro as Varonoff's Henchman
 Lloyd Whitlock as Detective Captain 
James B. Leong as 	Servant

References

Bibliography
 Pitts, Michael R. Poverty Row Studios, 1929–1940: An Illustrated History of 55 Independent Film Companies, with a Filmography for Each. McFarland & Company, 2005.

External links
 

1931 films
1931 drama films
American black-and-white films
American drama films
Mayfair Pictures films
Films directed by Stuart Paton
1930s English-language films
1930s American films